Aborichthys tikaderi is a species of stone loach endemic to Arunachal Pradesh, India where it is only known from streams in the Namdapha Wildlife Sanctuary. This fish grows to a length of  SL. The validity of this taxon is in doubt as it is similar to other species of the genus Aborichthys and more research is needed. If it is a valid species then it may be threatened by deforestation and the building of dams.

References

Nemacheilidae
Freshwater fish of India
Taxa named by Ram Prasad Barman
Fish described in 1985